Oakdale is an electoral ward in Poole, Dorset. Since 2019, the ward has elected 2 councillors to Bournemouth, Christchurch and Poole Council.

History 
The ward formerly elected three councillors to Poole Borough Council. Janet Walton was elected Mayor of Poole in 2015.

Geography 
The ward covers the suburb of the same name, as well as Stanley Green.

Councillors

Election result

References

External links 

 Listed buildings in Oakdale

Wards of Bournemouth, Christchurch and Poole
Politics of Poole